Tharaka Prabhu Films is an Indian film production company based out of Hyderabad. Established in 1977 by veteran actor, director Dasari Narayana Rao and Dasari Padma, the production house has produced several movies in the Tollywood Film Industry.

Film production

References

Film production companies based in Hyderabad, India
1977 establishments in Andhra Pradesh
Indian companies established in 1977